Wolfgang Schwanitz (26 June 1930 – 1 February 2022) was a German intelligence official, who was the last head of the Stasi, the East German secret police. It was officially renamed the "Office for National Security" on 17 November 1989. Unlike his predecessor, Erich Mielke, he did not hold the title "Minister of State Security", but held the title of "Leader of the Office for National Security". Following the German reunification, he was active as an author of works that sought to portray the Stasi in a positive light.

Career in East Germany

Early developments 
Schwanitz was born in Berlin. He became a member of the Free German Youth when the German Democratic Republic was founded. In 1950, he became a member of the Society for German-Soviet Friendship, and in 1953, of the Socialist Unity Party of Germany, the ruling East German communist party. He worked for the Stasi from 1951, and studied at the college of the Stasi, where he earned a doctorate with a dissertation on "combating hostile tendencies among the youth" (the doctorate is not recognized in present-day Germany). Between 1974 and 1986, he was head of Stasi in East Berlin. In 1986, he was appointed Stasi Lieutenant General and deputy of the Minister for State Security Erich Mielke.

Appointment as the "Leader of the Office of National Security" 
During the collapse of the communist regime in the autumn of 1989, both the long-time Head of State of East Germany, Erich Honecker, and the long-time head of the Stasi, Erich Mielke, resigned from their positions. Schwanitz was appointed the successor of Mielke as Leader of the Office for National Security and member of the Council of Ministers. The Stasi was dissolved on 31 March 1990. Since German reunification, Schwanitz was a leading member of the historical revisionist organisation Gesellschaft zur Rechtlichen und Humanitären Unterstützung, consisting of Stasi veterans who defend the communist regime and the Stasi.

Personal life and death 
Schwanitz died on 1 February 2022, at the age of 91.

References

Literature

Hubertus Knabe, Die Täter sind unter uns. Über das Schönreden der SED-Diktatur, Propyläen, Berlin 2007, 

1930 births
2022 deaths
Communist Party of Germany politicians
Socialist Unity Party of Germany politicians
Stasi officers
Politicians from Berlin